Arjun Prasad Joshi is a Nepalese politician. He was elected to the Pratinidhi Sabha in the 1999 election on behalf of the Nepali Congress which was claimed that he grabbed ticket from another candidate and won rigging. In the April 2008 Constituent Assembly election he was elected from the Parvat-1 constituency, winning 13258 votes.

References

Living people
Nepali Congress politicians from Gandaki Province
Year of birth missing (living people)
Nepal MPs 1999–2002
Members of the 1st Nepalese Constituent Assembly
Members of the 2nd Nepalese Constituent Assembly